Stanley Banda (born 5 June 1983) is a retired Zambian football midfielder.

References

1983 births
Living people
Zambian footballers
Zambia international footballers
Red Arrows F.C. players
National Assembly F.C. players
Mufulira Wanderers F.C. players
Association football midfielders
Zambia A' international footballers
2009 African Nations Championship players